Doğançay Waterfall is a waterfall in Sakarya Province, northwestern Turkey. It is a registered natural monument of the country.

The waterfall is located in Maksudiye village of Geyve district in Sakarya Province.

References

Waterfalls of Turkey
Landforms of Sakarya Province
Natural monuments of Turkey
Tourist attractions in Sakarya Province
Protected areas established in 2013
2013 establishments in Turkey